Top Latin Albums is a record chart published by Billboard magazine and is labeled as the most important music chart for Spanish language, full-length albums in the American music market. Like all Billboard album charts, the chart is based on sales. Nielsen SoundScan compiles the sales data from merchants representing more than 90 percent of the U.S. music retail market. The sample includes sales at music stores, the music departments of electronics and department stores, direct-to-consumer transactions, and Internet sales of physical albums or digital downloads. A limited array of verifiable sales from concert venues is also tabulated. To rank on this chart, an album must have 51% or more of its content recorded in Spanish. Listings of Top Latin Albums are also shown on Telemundo's music page through a partnership between the two companies. Before this, the first chart regarding Latin music albums in the magazine (Billboard Hot Latin Albums in Texas) was published on the issue dated December 30, 1972. Then, all Latin music information was featured on the Latin Pop Albums chart, which began on June 29, 1985, and is still running along with the Regional Mexican Albums and Tropical Albums chart. The Latin Pop Albums chart features music only from the pop genre, while the Regional Mexican Albums chart includes information from different genres like duranguense, norteño, banda and mariachi, and the Tropical Albums includes different genres particularly salsa, merengue, bachata,  and cumbia. In 2005, another chart; Latin Rhythm Albums was introduced in response to growing number of airplays from reggaeton. On the week ending January 26, 2017, Billboard updated the methodology to compile the Top Latin Albums chart into a multi-metric methodology to include track equivalent album units and streaming equivalent albums units.

The first album to appear at number-one on this chart was Mi Tierra by Gloria Estefan on July 10, 1993. This album spent 58 non-consecutive weeks at the top of this chart.

Mexican singers Marco Antonio Solís holds the record for the most number-one albums by an artist overall with 12. Fellow Mexican performers Los Temerarios is the group with the most chart-toppers, eight.

Jenni Rivera and Selena are the female artists with the most number-one albums with 7 each. Selena's album Dreaming of You was, until 2022, the only album to peak at number one during three different calendar years (1995–97). YHLQMDLG, by Puerto Rican rapper Bad Bunny, also achieved the feat by charting at #1 during four consecutive calendar years (2020–2023)
The current number one album is Mañana Será Bonito by Karol G.

Chart achievements

Artist with the most number-ones
Marco Antonio Solís (12)
Luis Miguel (9)
Enrique Iglesias (8)
Los Temerarios (8)
Bad Bunny (7)
Daddy Yankee (7)
Alejandro Fernández (7)
Jenni Rivera (7)
Los Tigres del Norte (7)
Maná (7)
Marc Anthony (7)
Selena (7)
Don Omar (6)
Ricky Martin (6)
Shakira (6)
Romeo Santos (5)
Wisin & Yandel (5)
Anuel AA (4)
Ozuna (4)
Thalía (4)

Top 20 Albums with Most Weeks at Number-One
The following are the top 20 longest-leading albums on the Top Latin Albums chart.

Top 10 Albums of All-Time (1993–2018)
In 2018, Billboard magazine compiled a ranking of the 20 best albums on the chart since its inception in 1993. The chart is based on the most number of weeks the albums spent on top of the chart. For albums with the same number of weeks at number one, they are ranked by the most total weeks on the chart.

Number-one debuts

Year-end best selling albums
According to the RIAA certification, regular gold certification is awarded for shipping of 500,000 copies, platinum for one million units, and multi-platinum for two million unites, and following in increments of one million thereafter. In addition, albums containing more than 50% Spanish language content may be awarded with Latin certification award, gold, (Disco de Oro) for shipments of 30,000 units, platinum (Disco de Platino) for 60,000 and multi-platinum (Multi-Platino) for 120,000 and following in increments of 60,000 thereafter (previously, Spanish-language albums were certified gold and platinum for 50,000 and 100,000 units shipped respectively before December 2013). In the following table, the certification shown is either the standard or Latin certification depending on whichever one results in a higher value.

Year-end charts
Year-end chart of 2008
Year-end chart of 2009

See also
List of best-selling Latin albums in the United States
Latin Pop Albums
Regional Mexican Albums
Tropical Albums
Latin Rhythm Albums
Hot Latin Songs

References

External links
Current Top Latin Albums on Billboard 
Current Top Latin albums on Telemundo

Top Latin Albums